Camigliano is a village in Tuscany, central Italy, administratively a frazione of the comune of Capannori, province of Lucca. At the time of the 2018 parish census its population was 1,965.

Main sights
 Church of San Michele (12th century)
 Villa Torrigiani (16th century)

References

Bibliography
 

Frazioni of the Province of Lucca